Zee Bollyworld TV is an online Indian Bollywood high-definition (HD) television channel, which is owned and operated by Zee Entertainment Enterprises and FilmOn. A large Indian media group, Zee Entertainment Enterprises made a partnership with US-based online TV provider FilmOn.com to launch the TV channel.

The channel was launched on 10 July 2015, and is programmed to offer movies and other Indian content in Hindi with English subtitles, along with business programming regarding behind-the-scenes and studio dealings in the Bollywood system. The channel is made available free on computers, tablets and other mobile devices.

Programming
Original programming on Zee Bollyworld TV has included Bollywood Families, Bollywood Business, Bollywood Life, Chillax Mornings, Back to Back Music, and Ek Ke Baad Ek.

See also
 ETC Bollywood Business

References

External links
 Official website

Hindi-language television stations
Internet television channels
Television channels and stations established in 2015
2015 establishments in India